Ed Nixon may refer to:

Edward Nixon (1930–2019), American entrepreneur and brother of former U.S. President Richard Nixon
Edgar Nixon, American civil rights leader